"Another Step (Closer to You)" is a song from the Kim Wilde album Another Step, performed as a duet with Junior Giscombe. It was released as the third single from the album.

Wilde co-wrote the song with Steve Byrd, who originally sang the male part on the demo. However, they decided the vocals would be better suited to someone with a more soulful voice and chose Giscombe. "Another Step" was not originally intended for release as a single; however, when trying to follow up "You Keep Me Hangin' On", producer Ricki Wilde decided that it was the best selection from the album, but needed remixing first. He kept the original vocals and a couple of the overdubs, but completely re-recorded the rest of the song.

It became another top 10 hit for Wilde in the UK, peaking at No. 6.

Charts

References

1986 songs
1987 singles
Kim Wilde songs
Junior Giscombe songs
Male–female vocal duets
Dance-rock songs
Synth rock songs
MCA Records singles
Songs written by Kim Wilde
Songs written by Steve Byrd